MS Pascal Lota (ex Superstar) is a fast ferry owned by the Corsica-based Corsica Ferries - Sardinia Ferries. She was built in 2008 at the Fincantieri shipyard in Ancona, Italy.

Concept and construction

The design of the Superstar is based on Moby Lines' MS Moby Aki. The original order included an option for a second ship of the same type, which Tallink decided not to exercise.

The keel of the vessel was laid on January 18, 2007. On October 5, 2007, the Superstar was christened by the Estonian tennis player Kaia Kanepi. The ship was delivered on 8 April 2008 and left Ancona for the Baltic Sea a day later.

Service history

Superstar entered service on Tallink's Helsinki–Tallinn route on 21 April 2008. On 30 April 2008 the ship suffered a hydraulics problem while leaving Tallinn, and one Tallinn–Helsinki roundtrip had to be cancelled. On 27 February 2009, while en route from Tallinn to Helsinki with 400 passengers on board, the ship's main engines stopped due to problems with the cooling systems at 8:45 am. The ship was adrift for nearly two hours, with emergency generators providing electricity, until full power could be restored at 10:30 am. Superstar arrived in Helsinki at 11:30, two hours behind schedule.

Design

The green external livery of the ship is according to Tallink promotion material "meant to reflect the environmentally friendly aspects of the ship's design".

The onboard facilities include a three-deck high showlounge, four restaurants, cafeteria, two bars, a casino, a business lounge and various shops.

Sister ship
 Moby Aki
 Moby Wonder
 MS Finlandia

References

External links 

 MS Superstar on Tallink website
 MS Superstar at marinetraffic.com

Ferries of Estonia
Cruiseferries
2007 ships
Ships built by Fincantieri
Ships built in Ancona